Tanguay is a surname. Notable people with the surname include: 

 Alex Tanguay (born 1979), Canadian ice hockey player 
 Bill Tanguay (1909–1971), American football player
 Cyprien Tanguay (1819–1902), French-Canadian priest and historian
 Eva Tanguay (1879–1947), Canadian-born singer and entertainer 
 Georges Tanguay (1856–1913), Canadian politician
 John Tanguay (born 1998), American rower
 Robyn Leigh Tanguay (born 1966), American researcher and educator

See also
 Yves Tanguy (1900–1955), French painter